Radu Albot was the defending champion but lost in the second round to Antoine Escoffier.

Quentin Halys won the title after defeating Vasek Pospisil 4–6, 6–4, 6–3 in the final.

Seeds

Draw

Finals

Top half

Bottom half

References

External links
Main draw
Qualifying draw

Teréga Open Pau-Pyrénées - 1